Stepojevac is a suburban settlement of the municipality of Lazarevac, Belgrade, Serbia.

References

External links

Populated places in Serbia
Lazarevac